Ximena Lourdes Aulestia Díaz (born 25 September 1952) is an Ecuadorian journalist and former beauty queen. At Miss Ecuador 1969, she was crowned Miss World Ecuador.

Biography
Ximena Aulestia was born 25 September 1952 in Rio de Janeiro, Brazil as a result of her parents, General Víctor Florencio Aulestia Mier and Sara Roxana Díaz Guerrero, being in the city because of a diplomatic mission to Brazil from Ecuador, giving her immediate Ecuadorian citizenship. She was born the sixth of seven children, second of her father's second marriage. In 1972, Aulestia's father became the Ecuadorian Minister of Defense to Guillermo Rodríguez, at the same time when Rodríguez founded Institute of National Higher Studies.

For her first ten years of life, Aulestia lived in the capital of Brazil, Brasília, returning to Ecuador in 1962 with her family to settle in Quito, the nation's capital. In 1969, she competed in Miss Ecuador 1969 as Miss Pichincha and was crowned Miss World Ecuador, the first finalist, and so represented Ecuador in the Miss World contest of that year.

Citations

1952 births
Living people
People from Rio de Janeiro (city)
Ecuadorian television presenters
Ecuadorian women television presenters
Miss Ecuador
Colombian television presenters
Colombian women television presenters
21st-century Ecuadorian women
Miss World 1969 delegates